Acompáñame may refer to:

Acompáñame (TV series), a 1977 Mexican telenovela
Acompáñame (album), an album by Yuri and Mijares
Acompáñame, an album by Rocío Dúrcal
Acompáñame (film), a 1966 Argentine film directed by Luis César Amadori